Fahad Al-Farhan (born 25 October 1995) is a Saudi Arabian handball player for Al-Rawdhah and the Saudi Arabian national team.

He participated at the 2017 World Men's Handball Championship.

References

1995 births
Living people
Saudi Arabian male handball players
21st-century Saudi Arabian people